is a Japanese athlete specialising in the javelin throw. She represented her country at the 2011 World Championships without qualifying for the final. In addition, she won two bronze medals at the Asian Championships.

Her personal best in the event is 60.86 metres set in Osaka in 2016.

International competitions

References

1984 births
Living people
Sportspeople from Osaka Prefecture
Japanese female javelin throwers
World Athletics Championships athletes for Japan
Asian Games competitors for Japan
Athletes (track and field) at the 2018 Asian Games
Japan Championships in Athletics winners
21st-century Japanese women